Undone may refer to:

Music 
 "Undone – The Sweater Song", a 1994 single by Weezer
 "Undone" (Stellar song), 1999
 "Undone" (Joe Nichols song), 2016
 Undone (Brian & Jenn Johnson album), 2001
 Undone (MercyMe album), 2004
 Undone (Tony Duggins album), 2006
 "Undone", a song by Failure on the 1994 album Magnified
 "Undone", a song by Haley Reinhart on the album Listen Up!
 "Undone", a song by Pearl Jam on the 2003 album Lost Dogs
 "Undone", a song by Sara Groves on the 2004 album The Other Side of Something
 "Undone", a song by Lifehouse on the 2005 album Lifehouse
 "Undone", a song by All That Remains on the 2008 album Overcome
 "Undone", a song by DeVotchKa on the 2008 album A Mad & Faithful Telling
 "Undone," a song by Backstreet Boys on the 2009 album This Is Us
 "Undone", a song by Dean Brody on the 2009 album Dean Brody
 "Undone", a song by Five Finger Death Punch on the 2009 album War Is the Answer
 "Undone", a song by No Doubt on the 2012 album Push and Shove
 Undun, a 2011 album by The Roots
 "Undun," a song by The Guess Who on the 1969 album Canned Wheat

Written fiction 
 Undone (short story collection), 1993 book by Paul Jennings
 Undone (Slaughter novel),  by Karin Slaughter
 Undone (Colapinto novel), a 2016 novel by John Colapinto
 Undone (radio series), a science fiction comedy series, broadcast from 2006 to 2010
 Elena Undone, a 2010 lesbian romance drama
 Undone (Humphreys novel), 2013 book by Sara Humphreys

Other uses
 UNDONE (tag), a possible tag in a comment in programming
 Undone (TV series), a 2019 animated series on Amazon Video
 Undone, the original title for the 2015 film Across the Line
 Undone (podcast), a former podcast produced by Gimlet Media

See also
 Come Undone (disambiguation)
 Undun (disambiguation)